José Octavio Bordón (born 22 December 1945) is an Argentine politician and diplomat. He was governor of Mendoza Province from 1987 to 1991, and served in both houses of the National Congress as a National Deputy and a National Senator. Most recently, he was the Argentine ambassador to the United States from 2003 to 2007 and to Chile from 2016 to 2019.

Life and career

Born in Rosario in 1945, Bordón graduated in sociology from the Universidad del Salvador in Buenos Aires in 1970. He was Professor of Political Sociology at Universidad Nacional de Cuyo from 1972 to 1976, and again from 1983 to 1995. He became President of the Fundación Andina in 1982. In 1983 he was elected to the Argentine Chamber of Deputies as deputy for Mendoza Province for the Justicialist Party. He was deputy chairman of the foreign affairs committee.

In 1987 Bordón was elected governor of Mendoza Province, stepping down in 1991. The following year he was elected to the Argentine Senate. Over that period he had become distant from the Peronist leadership, which under President Carlos Menem had moved to the right with neoliberal economic policies. In 1994 he led his followers into a new leftwing alliance, FrePaSo, with other parties and dissident Peronists. FrePaSo's popularity grew quickly. At that time he was a visiting professor at Georgetown University.

Bordón became presidential candidate for FrePaSo for the 1995 general elections, with Carlos Chacho Álvarez as his running mate. Despite being such a new party, Frepaso came in second with 30%, relegating the well-established UCR, Argentina's oldest political party still in existence, to third place. However, not long after the election, Bordón fell out with FrePaSo in a leadership dispute and returned to the Justicialist Party.

Bordón worked as a consultant at the Inter-American Development Bank from 1998 until 1999, and then again in 2003. He was Director of Diálogo y Perspectiva Internacional magazine 1989-94, and Director of Temas de MERCOSUR magazine 1996-2000.

Bordón served as General Director of Culture and Education for Buenos Aires Province from 1999 until 2001, and as Executive Director of the Social and Economic Development Program, from 2002 to 2003. President Néstor Kirchner appointed Bordón Ambassador to the United States in June 2003, and he remained in the post throughout Kirchner's term, until December 2007.

The prominent diplomat and politician is a member of the Inter-American Dialogue, is married to the former Mónica González Gaviola and has three children. Bordón suffered a fall while on vacation in Cariló. Hospitalized in nearby Pinamar, his condition was deemed stable.

References

External links

Profile, Embassy of Argentina

1945 births
Living people
Ambassadors of Argentina to Chile
Ambassadors of Argentina to the United States
Argentine diplomats
Argentine people of Spanish descent
Argentine sociologists
Candidates for President of Argentina
Front for a Country in Solidarity politicians
Governors of Mendoza Province
Justicialist Party politicians
Members of the Argentine Chamber of Deputies elected in Mendoza
Members of the Argentine Senate for Mendoza
Members of the Inter-American Dialogue
People from Rosario, Santa Fe